Ras-related protein Rab-18 is a protein that in humans is encoded by the RAB18 gene. 

Rab18 is a ubiquitously expressed protein with particularly high expression in the brain. Rab18 was first characterised as an endosomal protein in epithelial cells of mouse kidney and intestines. Subsequent studies revealed that Rab18 has a wide intracellular distribution; localising to the Golgi complex, endoplasmic reticulum, lipid droplets, and cytosol of various cell types. In the brain, Rab18 has been isolated in association with synaptic vesicles and has been observed to localise to secretory granules in neuroendocrine cells.

Mutations in RAB18, RAB3GAP1, RAB3GAP2, or TBC1D20 are thought to cause Warburg Micro Syndrome by disrupting RAB18 function. RAB3GAP1, RAB3GAP2, and TBC1D20 genes offer instructions for creating proteins that regulate RAB18. The RAB3GAP1 and RAB3GAP2 proteins interact and create a complex that turns on RAB18. The TBC1D20 protein turns off RAB18.

References

Further reading